Gaston Joseph Clément Demers (November 23, 1935 – February 7, 2004) was a politician in Ontario, Canada. He was a Progressive Conservative member of the Legislative Assembly of Ontario from 1963 to 1971 who represented the northern Ontario riding of Nickel Belt.

Before entering politics, Demers had worked as a journalist for the North Bay Nugget and as a town clerk in Chelmsford. At the time of his election, he was the youngest Member of Provincial Parliament ever elected to the provincial legislature.

After leaving politics, he served on the boards of FedNor and of Sudbury's Laurentian Hospital, and was a key lobbyist behind the creation of Collège Boréal.

External links

1935 births
2004 deaths
Franco-Ontarian people
Politicians from Greater Sudbury
Progressive Conservative Party of Ontario MPPs